Julia Gutiérrez Caba OAXS MML (born on 20 October 1934 in Madrid) is a Spanish theatre and film actress.

Biography
She is the daughter of actors Emilio Gutiérrez Esteban and Irene Caba Alba and sister of the actress Irene Gutiérrez Caba and actor Emilio Gutiérrez Caba.

Movie career
Caba has not acted in a lot of films, she preferred stage and television, but she's the protagonist of Juan Antonio Bardem's masterpiece Nunca pasa nada and she appears in cult classic La gran familia film. She's very popular, even in Finland, for her role in TV series Los Serrano. She has won a Goya Awards as Best Supporting Actress for her role in José Luis Garci's You're the one.

Filmography

Film

Honours
 Gold Medal of Merit in Labour (Kingdom of Spain, 1 December 2006).
 Dame Grand Cross of the Civil Order of Alfonso X, the Wise (Kingdom of Spain, 7 October 2016).

References

External links
 

1934 births
Living people
Actresses from Madrid
Spanish film actresses
Spanish television actresses
Best Supporting Actress Goya Award winners
Recipients of the Civil Order of Alfonso X, the Wise
20th-century Spanish actresses
21st-century Spanish actresses